Thomas Joseph Shelley (12 November 1876 – 16 March 1964) was an Australian rules footballer who played with Geelong in the Victorian Football League (VFL).

Notes

External links 

1876 births
1964 deaths
Australian rules footballers from Victoria (Australia)
Geelong Football Club players
Barwon Football Club players